Regas is a surname. Notable persons with that name include:

 Dimitrios Regas (born 1986), Greek sprint athlete
 George Regas (1890–1940), Greek-American actor
 George F. Regas (1930–2021), American Episcopal priest
 Pedro Regas (1897–1974), Greek-American actor
 Rosa Regàs (born 1933), Catalan writer

Greek-language surnames
Surnames